Dalayer-e Sofla (also Romanized as Dalāyer-e Soflá and Dalayer Sofla; also known as Dālair Pāin and Dalāyer-e Pā’īn) is a village in Karasf Rural District, in the Central District of Khodabandeh County, Zanjan Province, Iran. At the 2006 census, its population was 578, in 129 families.

References 

Populated places in Khodabandeh County